

Conrad Neitz
The first Bible translation into the Kalmyk language was about 1750 by Conrad Neitz, Morovian missionary at Sarepta.

Schmidt
Isaac Jacob Schmidt, a Moravian, translated the gospels, publishing Matthew in St. Petersburg in 1815. This was the first book to be printed in the Kalmyk language. The remaining gospels and Acts were published by 1821, and the whole New Testament by 1827.

Pozdneev
In 1880 Aleksei Matveevich Pozdneev (1851–1920) and Archpriest Smirnoff were employed to translate Matthew. Prof. Pozdneev made two journeys to Astrakhan to work at the translation among the people; and in 1884 2,000 copies of the four gospels were authorised, new type being cut at the British and Foreign Bible Society's expense: the number was increased to 4,000 with 1,000 additional of each Gospel, and Gospels published in 1887. 

On the death of Smirnoff, M. D. Kutusov, a native speaker of Kalmyk and lecturer in St. Petersburg University, assisted Pozdneev (1887). In 1887 Pozdneev visited Astrakhan, correcting his Acts and distributing Gospels; he also visited nomadic camps and read to all, including Buddhists. After three more journeys to the steppes he completed the New Testament, Acts to Revelation (Dordzhe Kulusoff assisted Pozdneev for this part of the translation). Printing was delayed by his having to undertake an expedition to Chinese Turkestan in 1893; but with the aid of Docent Pussell printing was completed in 1895. The individual gospels were reprinted again in 1896 by the British and Foreign Bible Society in Shanghai.

Mather
Percy Mather also worked on Kalmyk Bible translation in Xinjiang, but his work seems to have been lost.

IBT
The Institute for Bible Translation is working on a translation into modern Kalmyk. The New Testament is complete, and was published in 2002 as Шин Бооцан.

See also
Bible translations into the languages of Russia

References 

Kalmyk language
Christianity in Russia
Kamlyk